Long Island is a small island within the Great Sound of Bermuda. It lies in the southeast of the sound, and is in the north of  Warwick Parish. Like its neighbour Hawkins Island, it was a prisoner of war camp during the Second Boer War from 1901 to 1902.

Islands of Bermuda
Warwick Parish